Arthur Walters Wills (1868-17 November 1948), was a British Liberal Party politician.

Background
He was a son of George Wills of Moretonhampstead, Devon. He was educated at Harrow and Trinity College, Cambridge. He married in 1908, Margery Eyre-Walker of Byfleet, Surrey. They had two sons and two daughters.

Legal career
He took honours in law in 1890. As a Barrister-at-law, he was called to Bar in 1894 and joined the Western Circuit.

Political career
He sat as Liberal MP for Dorset North from January 1905 to January 1910. He was elected at the first time of asking at the North Dorset by-election in January 1905 when he gained the seat from the Conservatives. 

He held the seat a year later at the 1906 General Election. 

He lost his seat back to the Conservatives at the January 1910 General Election. He failed to re-gain his seat at the general election 11 months later;

He did not stand for parliament again.

Sources
Who Was Who
British parliamentary election results 1885–1918, Craig, F. W. S.

References

External links 
 
Who Was Who; http://www.ukwhoswho.com

1868 births
1948 deaths
Liberal Party (UK) MPs for English constituencies
UK MPs 1900–1906
UK MPs 1906–1910
People educated at Harrow School
Alumni of Trinity College, Cambridge